George Frederick Binks (January 1899–unknown) was an English footballer who played in the Football League for Walsall.

References

1899 births
English footballers
Association football midfielders
English Football League players
Birmingham City F.C. players
Walsall F.C. players
Year of death missing